Juan Gerardo Ramírez Alonso (born 16 May 1998) is a Mexican footballer who plays as a defender for Spanish club CD Ribert in the fifth-tier Tercera División RFEF. Besides Mexico, he has played for clubs in Spain, Lithuania  and the Netherlands.

Career statistics

Club

Notes

References

External links
 

1998 births
Footballers from Guadalajara, Jalisco
Living people
Mexican footballers
Mexican expatriate footballers
Association football defenders
Club Necaxa footballers
Cruz Azul footballers
FC Stumbras players
Roda JC Kerkrade players
C.D. Tepatitlán de Morelos players
Liga Premier de México players
Tercera División de México players
Tercera División players
A Lyga players
Eerste Divisie players
Tercera Federación players
Mexican expatriate sportspeople in Spain
Expatriate footballers in Spain
Mexican expatriate sportspeople in Lithuania
Expatriate footballers in Lithuania
Mexican expatriate sportspeople in the Netherlands
Expatriate footballers in the Netherlands